Azeloprazole (also known as Z-215 or E3710) is a drug under investigation for acid-related medical conditions responsive to suppressing the production of stomach acid. It is considered to be a member of the proton pump inhibitor class of medications.

Medical uses
Azeloprazole is an acid suppressing drug being studied for the treatment of gastroesophageal reflux disease (GERD).

Pharmacology

Mechanism of action
Azeloprazole, like other drugs of the proton pump inhibitor class, works by inhibiting the hydrogen potassium adenosine triphosphatase (H+/K+ ATPase) acid pump. The term "proton pump inhibitor" comes from the recognition of hydrogen as a single proton. H+/K+ ATPase pumps, found in parietal cells in the stomach, are ultimately responsible for secreting acid into the lumen of the stomach. By inhibiting the secretion of acid, proton pump inhibitors are considered to be useful in the treatment of "acid-related diseases" (e.g. gastroesophageal reflux disease).

Chemistry
Azeloprazole is soluble in DMSO.

History
Azeloprazole was designed in Japan with pharmacogenomics in mind. Some drugs in the proton pump inhibitor class are metabolized by the hepatic enzyme CYP2C19. Some individuals, such as people of Japanese ancestry, are more likely to be poor CYP2C19 metabolizers; that is, their ability to metabolize certain drugs through CYP2C19 is compromised by a genetic mutation in one or both copies of the CYP2C19 gene that renders the enzyme nonfunctional or less functional. Azeloprazole was designed to avoid CYP2C19 metabolism entirely, thereby avoiding pharmacogenomic issues with poor CYP2C19 metabolizers.

Azeloprazole was designed by the Japanese pharmaceutical company Eisai Co Ltd.

Society and culture

Legal status
In the United States, proton pump inhibitors are found both over the counter and by prescription. However, azeloprazole is not FDA approved in the United States.

Research
Azeloprazole completed phase II clinical trials for erosive esophagitis in Japan in 2017, and phase II clinical trials for GERD in the United States in 2016.

References 

Proton-pump inhibitors
Benzimidazoles
Sulfoxides
Pyridines
Dioxanes
Experimental drugs
Aromatic ethers